Háromszék (Three Seats; Romanian: Trei Scaune) was an administrative county (comitatus) of the Kingdom of Hungary. Situated in south-eastern Transylvania, its territory is now in central Romania (in the counties of Covasna, Brașov and Bacău). The capital of the county was Sepsiszentgyörgy (now Sfântu Gheorghe).

Geography

Háromszék county shared borders with Romania and the Hungarian counties Csík, Udvarhely, Nagy-Küküllő, and Brassó. The river Olt flowed through the county. The Carpathian Mountains formed its southern and eastern border. Its area was  around 1910.

History

Háromszék means "three seats". Háromszék County was a combination of three seats of the Székelys: Kézdiszék, Orbaiszék, and Sepsiszék (plus some villages of the former Felső-Fehér County). The county was formed in 1876, when the administrative structure of Transylvania was changed.

In 1920, under the Treaty of Trianon, the county became part of Romania under the name Trei Scaune. After the Second Vienna Award, the county was recreated with most of its historic territory as it became part of Hungary again until the end of World War II.

Afterward, it became part of Romania again; its territory lies mainly in the present Romanian county of Covasna, with a small part in the south being part of Brașov County.

Demographics

Subdivisions

In the early 20th century, the subdivisions of Háromszék county were:

Notes

References

External links
 Map of the county
 Kézdivásárhely Info Centrum

States and territories established in 1940
States and territories disestablished in 1920
States and territories disestablished in 1945
Kingdom of Hungary counties in Transylvania